Rembangan is a tourist attraction in Jember, East Java. Located at the foot of Mount Argopuro, the complex is known for its panoramic views and dragonfruit orchards.

Location and facilities

Administratively, it is part of Kemuning Lor Village, Arjasa District, Jember, East Java. The site is managed by the Jember regional government.

The road to Rembangan has many dragonfruit orchards along it. There are also several coffee plantations in the area, which are open to the public on working days.  there is no public transport to the peak, although motorcycles or cars can be rented for the journey. The road, with its many turns and sharp drops, is dangerous for large busses, and fatal accidents have occurred; one, in 2002, caused the deaths of 22 passengers.

In Rembangan there is a hotel, built during the Dutch colonial period, which has 41 rooms. The hotel and its environs, including a pool and gardens, are used for rest and relaxation. On the grounds of the hotel is a dragonfruit orchard with approximately 600 plants; the fruit may be picked, for a fee; the area's dragonfruit is among the most commons souvenirs bought there. The hotel provides accommodations for tourists as well as conferences, seminars, and workshops. Other facilities include a spring, for bathing.

The view from the peak is considered Rembangan's greatest attraction. Laili Damayanti of Tabloid Nova writes that the night-time view is the more popular one, and Icha Rahmanti of The Jakarta Post describes the view as "terrific".

History
During the 2012 Christmas holiday, Rembangan was one of Jember's most popular tourist attractions, together with Papuma Beach and the Sukorambi Botanical Garden.

In 2013 the Jember police, following up on complaints that temporary food kiosks on the road to Rembangan were being used for "immoral" ("asusila") activities, began removing these stalls.

References

Works cited

Further reading

Buildings and structures in East Java
Tourist attractions in East Java
Hotels in Indonesia